This is a list of Los Angeles Historic-Cultural Monuments in Silver Lake, Angelino Heights, and Echo Park, Los Angeles, California. The list includes locations in Silver Lake, Angelino Heights, Echo Park, as well the Elysian Park area. There are more than 63 Historic-Cultural Monuments (HCM) in these areas. They are designated by the City's Cultural Heritage Commission.

Historic-Cultural Monuments

Non-HCM historic sites recognized by state and nation

See also

Lists of L.A. Historic-Cultural Monuments
 Historic-Cultural Monuments in Downtown Los Angeles
 Historic-Cultural Monuments on the East and Northeast Sides
 Historic-Cultural Monuments in the Harbor area
 Historic-Cultural Monuments in Hollywood
 Historic-Cultural Monuments in the San Fernando Valley

 Historic-Cultural Monuments in South Los Angeles
 Historic-Cultural Monuments on the Westside
 Historic-Cultural Monuments in the Wilshire and Westlake areas

Other
 City of Los Angeles' Historic Preservation Overlay Zones
 National Register of Historic Places listings in Los Angeles
 National Register of Historic Places listings in Los Angeles County
 List of California Historical Landmarks

References

External links
 official Designated L.A. Historic-Cultural Monuments (LAHCM) website — with 'ever-updated' LAHCM list via PDF link.
 Los Angeles HCM Report for Silver Lake, Echo Park and Elysian Valley — L.A Planning Department.
 City of Los Angeles Map — via Given Place Media.
 Big Orange Landmarks:  "Exploring the Landmarks of Los Angeles, One Monument at a Time" — online photos and in-depth history of Silver Lake/Echo Park/Elysian Valley LAHCMonuments — Website curator: Floyd B. Bariscale.

 
Los Angeles-related lists

Silver Lake